The Roman Catholic Diocese of Itapeva is a diocese located in the city of Itapeva in the Ecclesiastical province of Sorocaba in Brazil.

History
 2 March 1968: Established as Diocese of Itapeva from the Metropolitan Archdiocese of Botucatu, Diocese of Sorocaba and Diocese of Santos

Bishops
 Bishops of Itapeva (Roman rite), in reverse chronological order
 Bishop Arnaldo Carvalheiro Neto (2016.10.19 – 2022.06.15) appointed Bishop of Jundiaí, Sao Paulo
 Bishop José Moreira de Melo (1996.01.17 – 2016.10.19)
 Bishop Alano Maria Pena, O.P. (later Archbishop) (1985.07.11 – 1993.11.24), appointed Bishop of Nova Friburgo, Rio de Janeiro
 Bishop Fernando Legal, S.D.B. (1980.03.28 – 1985.04.25), appointed Bishop of Limeira, São Paulo
 Bishop José Lambert Filho, C.S.S. (1975.01.04 – 1979.11.30), appointed Coadjutor Bishop of Sorocaba; future Archbishop
 Bishop Silvio Maria Dário (1968.03.27 – 1974.05.02)

Coadjutor bishop
Arnaldo Carvalheiro Neto (2016)

References
 GCatholic.org
 Catholic Hierarchy

Roman Catholic dioceses in Brazil
Christian organizations established in 1968
Itapeva, Roman Catholic Diocese of
Roman Catholic dioceses and prelatures established in the 20th century